Thinungei  is a small village situated within the Bishnupur district in the Indian state of Manipur.

Demographics
The total geographical area of the village is 1825.14 hectares. Thinungei has a total population of 4,027. Male population with 1999 and female with 2028. There are about 859 houses in Thinungei village. Ningthoukhong and Phubala are the nearest villages.

Tourist spots
Loktak Lake

References

External links
https://villageinfo.in/manipur/bishnupur/bishnupur/thinungei.html

Villages in Bishnupur district